Viškovci can refer to:

 Viškovci, a village and municipality in Osijek-Baranja County, Croatia
 Viškovci, Požega-Slavonia County, a village near Pleternica, Croatia

See also 
 Višković, Serbian family name